Spirit Island is a tiny tied island in Maligne Lake in Jasper National Park. This landmark is the destination of boat trips across Maligne Lake, a view many people associate with the Canadian Rockies. Spirit Island enjoys worldwide reputation, and is one of the most famous and photographed views of the Canadian Rockies. Maligne Lake boat cruises offer close views of the island.

References

Jasper National Park
Lake islands of Alberta